Oradour (Auvergnat: Orador) is a former commune in the département of Cantal in south-central France. On 1 January 2017, it was merged into the new commune Neuvéglise-sur-Truyère.

Population

See also
 Communes of the Cantal department

References

Former communes of Cantal
Cantal communes articles needing translation from French Wikipedia
Populated places disestablished in 2017